The Gölbaşı Ground Station is a ground station designed as a terminal for telecommunication with Türksat spacecraft. Owned and operated by the state-owned telecommunications provider Türksat company, it is situated in Gölbaşı district of Ankara Province in Turkey.

The earth station was established in 1994 for servicing Turkey's first communications satellite Türksat 1B launched on August 11 that year.

The backup station has a  antenna available.

The facility features, in full backup, a satellite control center, an observation and control center, a communications observation center and a data encryption center. Further, a satellite simulator provides training for the operators, which is also used for approval purposes of procedures to be applied on the spacecraft.

Since the ground station in Gölbaşı is capable of servicing three satellites at a time only, it is projected to expand its capacity with regard of the launch of Türksat 4A satellite in 2014. The construction of a backup ground station in Konya is planned.

Earthquake risk
On December 20, 2007, an earthquake of 5.7 magnitude occurred in Balâ, Ankara, about  far from Gölbaşı Ground Station. Although the ground station was not affected by the earthquake, the incident showed the possible risk of telecommunication blackout and loss of satellites in orbit in case of an earthquake. Due to proximity of the backup facility to the ground station, the earthquake risk is much high.

A report states that when the link between the spacecraft and the earth station is interrupted for a period of 48 hours, the re-establishment of the link is unlikely.

References

Earth stations in Turkey
1994 establishments in Turkey
Buildings and structures completed in 1994
Buildings and structures in Ankara Province
Satellite Control Ground Center